Columbia Historic District is a national historic district located at Columbia, Lancaster County, Pennsylvania. The district includes 833 contributing buildings, 2 contributing sites, and 7 contributing structures in the central business district and surrounding residential areas of Columbia.  The district is primarily residential with notable examples of Late Victorian architectural styles.  Notable non-residential buildings include the Reading and Columbia Freight Station (1883), Holy Trinity Catholic Church and School (1915), American Legion Post 469, Women's Club, Columbia Lodge #1074 BPOE, Columbia Town Hall (1874, 1947), St. Paul's Episcopal Church (1888), Franklin Hotel (c. 1833), and Columbia Water Company (1849 and later). Located in the district is the separately listed Bachman and Forry Tobacco Warehouse.

It was listed on the National Register of Historic Places in 1983.

Gallery

References

External links
Description of Columbia Historic District

Historic districts on the National Register of Historic Places in Pennsylvania
Historic districts in Lancaster County, Pennsylvania
National Register of Historic Places in Lancaster County, Pennsylvania